Alberto Cerqui (born 20 June 1992, in Brescia) is an Italian racing driver. He has competed in the World Touring Car Championship.

Career

Single seaters
After winning titles in karting, Cerqui graduated to single-seater racing in 2009, racing in Formula Azzurra. He scored four victories, two pole positions and six podiums from 16 races on his way to the title. He graduated to the Italian Formula Three Championship in 2010, driving for Ombra Racing. He finished 19th in the final classification, scoring three points.

Superstars Series
At the end of 2010 he tested for the Team BMW Italia Superstars Series team at Adria. In January 2011 Cerqui was announced as a driver for the team. Cerqui scored three successive pole positions at Portimão, Donington Park and Misano, and took his maiden win at Misano.

World Touring Car Championship

ROAL Motorsport (2012)
Cerqui stayed with ROAL Motorsport for 2012 to race in the World Touring Car Championship as teammate to Tom Coronel. He finished in the points in both races at his home event, the season opening Race of Italy. The first race of the Race of Slovakia saw Cerqui climb from twelfth on the grid to fourth in the results. He qualified 13th for the Race of Hungary but a parc fermé infringement by his team saw both cars sent to the back of the grid with Cerqui lining up 20th and 19th for race one and race two respectively. During race two of the Race of Portugal, Yvan Muller spun and Cerqui was able to take his fifth place until Muller took it back later in the race. The Race of Brazil saw Cerqui retire twice; contact in race one with Tiago Monteiro forced him to retire on lap two, then a collision in race two with Aleksei Dudukalo saw Cerqui crash into the pit wall. Race one of the Race of United States saw him involved in a first lap pileup involving six cars, forcing Cerqui, Dudukalo and Fernando Monje to retire. In race one at the Race of Japan, Cerqui had passed the Team Aon car of James Nash but soon after spun and ended his race in the gravel trap at the first corner. After the race he was also handed a 30-second time penalty for a start infringement although having retired this did not affect his overall result. Cerqui ended his non-scoring streak at the Race of China with a pair of top ten finishes. Cerqui sat out the final round in Macau and was replaced by Kei Cozzolino. Cerqui stated that before the season started, he agreed with his team that he would only participate in the Macau races if he were still in contention for the Yokohama Drivers' Trophy.

Racing record

Complete International Superstars Series results
(key) (Races in bold indicate pole position) (Races in italics indicate fastest lap)

Complete World Touring Car Championship results
(key) (Races in bold indicate pole position) (Races in italics indicate fastest lap)

References

External links

Official website

1992 births
Living people
Sportspeople from Brescia
Italian racing drivers
Italian Formula Three Championship drivers
World Touring Car Championship drivers
Superstars Series drivers
BMW M drivers
Ombra Racing drivers